James Pugh may refer to:

James L. Pugh (1820–1907), U.S. Senator from Alabama
James Pugh (footballer) (1891–?), English footballer
James E. Pugh (born 1950), American trombonist and composer
Jim Pugh (born 1964), former American professional tennis player
James Pugh (soldier) (18th century), colonial American militia soldier, executed by North Carolina Governor William Tryon for supporting the Regulator Movement